Andrew Graham Downton (born 17 July 1977) is an Australian cricketer, who played for the Tasmanian Tigers. He plays club cricket for South Hobart/Sandy Bay Cricket Club.

Andrew Downton had an impressive start to his first class career, taking 6/56 against the New South Wales Blues on debut. However he has since struggled to come back from injuries which saw him miss most of the 2004–05 season, and recapture his impressive initial form.

External links

1977 births
Living people
Australian cricketers
Tasmania cricketers
Cricketers from Sydney